Sundarban Mahavidyalaya, established in 1965, is an undergraduate college in Kakdwip, West Bengal, India. It is affiliated with the University of Calcutta.

Departments

Science
Chemistry
Physics
Mathematics

Humanities and Commerce
Bengali
English
Sanskrit
History
Geography
Political Science
Philosophy
Economics
Education
Accounts

Accreditation
Sundarban Mahavidyalaya is recognized by the University Grants Commission (UGC).

See also
Sundarban Hazi Desarat College
List of colleges affiliated to the University of Calcutta
Education in India
Education in West Bengal

References

External links
Sundarban Mahavidyalaya

Educational institutions established in 1965
University of Calcutta affiliates
Universities and colleges in South 24 Parganas district
1965 establishments in West Bengal